Food of Love is a 1973 album by Yvonne Elliman, produced by Rupert Hine, released on Purple Records in England and MCA Records in America.

Yvonne Elliman arrived in London from Hawaii having graduated from college, and was cast by Andrew Lloyd Webber/Tim Rice in their musical Jesus Christ Superstar.  Her big song in the rock opera, "I Don't Know How To Love Him", made her a star, and the song is referred to in a song on this album, "I Don't Know How to Love Him Blues", written by  David MacIver and Rupert Hine. Musicians who appear on Food of Love include keyboardist Peter Robinson, bass player John Gustafson, guitarists Caleb Quaye and Mick Grabham, and also Pete Townshend of The Who (Elliman covers their debut hit "I Can't Explain" on the album). Elliman also covers  Robbie Robertson's "The Moon Struck One" from Cahoots. A song by the, at the time, virtually unknown Jim Steinman, "Happy Ending", also appears.

Track listing
 "Casserole Me Over" (David MacIver, Rupert Hine) - 2:49
 "More than one, less than Five" (MacIver, Hine) - 3:52
 "I Want to Make you Laugh, I Want to Make you Cry" (James Rado) - 4:24
 "Muesli Dreams" (MacIver, Hine) - 3:48
 "I Can't Explain" (Pete Townshend) - 3:12
 "Sunshine" (MacIver, Hine) - 3:46
 "Hawaii"  (Elliman) - 3:12
 "I Don't Know How To Love Him Blues" (MacIver, Hine) - 2:57
 "The Moon Struck One" (Robbie Robertson) - 4:24
 "Happy Ending" (Jim Steinman) - 3:57
 "Love's Been Bringing Me Down" (MacIver, Hine) - 5:13

Personnel 
 Yvonne Elliman - vocals
 Caleb Quaye - guitar
 Morris Pert - percussion
 Daryl Runswick - bass guitar
 Peter Robinson - keyboards
 Michael Giles - drums
 Mick Grabham - guitar
 John Gustafson - bass guitar
 Simon Jeffes - guitar
 Rupert Hine - ARP synthesizer, harmonica, keyboards
 Ray Cooper - percussion
 Ann Odell - keyboards
 John G. Perry - bass guitar
 Pete Townshend - guitar
 Irene Chandler - backing vocals
 Joanne Williams - backing vocals
 Liza Strike - backing vocals
 Rosetta Hightower - backing vocals
 Ruby James - backing vocals

References 

1973 albums
Albums produced by Rupert Hine
Purple Records albums
MCA Records albums